Bakhoun     is a Lebanese village, located in the Miniyeh-Danniyeh District. It had 6,451 eligible voters in the 2009 elections, and the residents were mainly Sunni Muslim.

History
In 1838, Eli Smith noted  the village as Bukha'un,  located in the Ed-Dunniyeh area. The inhabitants were   Sunni Muslim, Greek Orthodox  and Maronites.

References

Bibliography

External links
Bakhoun, Localiban

Populated places in Miniyeh-Danniyeh District
Populated places in Lebanon
Sunni Muslim communities in Lebanon
Shia Muslim communities in Lebanon